Raimo Kangro (21 September 1949 Tartu – 4 February 2001 Ruila, Harju County) was an Estonian composer. He composed mainly instrumental works and operas.

In 1968 he graduated from Tallinn State Conservatory in composition speciality.

1989-2001 he taught at Estonian Academy of Music and Theatre.

1993-2000 he was the director of Estonian Music Foundation.

Since 1973 he was a member of Estonian Composers' Union.

He died in 2001. He is buried at Tallinn Forest Cemetery.

Personal life
His wife was Leelo Tungal. His daughters were Kirke and Maarja Kangro.

Works

1980: rock opera "Põhjaneitsi" ('The Maiden of the North')

References

1949 births
2001 deaths
20th-century Estonian composers
Estonian Academy of Music and Theatre alumni
Academic staff of the Estonian Academy of Music and Theatre
Recipients of the Order of the White Star, 4th Class
People from Tartu
Burials at Metsakalmistu